Maurizio Millenotti (born 12 June 1946) is an Italian costume designer. He was nominated twice for the Academy Award for Best Costume Design: the first time for his work in Otello (1986). The second time for his work in Hamlet (1990).

References

External links 

Italian costume designers
1946 births
Living people
Place of birth missing (living people)
Ciak d'oro winners
David di Donatello winners
Nastro d'Argento winners